Necrom is a fictional supervillain appearing in American comic books published by Marvel Comics. The character has been depicted as an enemy of the British superhero group Excalibur. Created by writer/artist Alan Davis, the character first appeared in Excalibur #46 (January, 1992), which depicted him as a powerful sorcerer who sought the power of the cosmic entity known as the Phoenix Force, with which he threatened the entire multiverse.

Fictional character biography
Centuries ago, Necrom was the Sorcerer Supreme of his race, based on an alternate reality Earth. His students were Merlyn and Feron. Necrom desired power and decided to use his students to create an alignment between parallel universes, which would generate incredible amounts of magical energy. Necrom and his students travelled to Earth-616 and Necrom asked Feron to summon the Phoenix Force. The Phoenix Force projected an ancient tower on Earth 616 across the multiverse creating an alignment and an energy matrix. Necrom then revealed his true plan: he attacked Feron, trying to drain the Phoenix Force from his body, but Feron was empowered by the Phoenix Force and fought back. Meanwhile, Merlyn saw his opportunity and claimed the power of the energy matrix for himself. Necrom was wounded by Feron, but managed to grab a small piece of the Phoenix Force from him. The Phoenix Force, wounded, left Feron and fled Earth 616. Necrom retreated to recover. He left the piece of Phoenix Force that he had stolen to animate a corpse, buried underground and over time this being would become known as the Anti-Phoenix. Necrom left Earth 616 and travelled to Earth-148 to hide from Merlyn, who feared his master's return. Over the next few centuries Merlyn started to create defenses against Necrom, including the Captain Britain Corps, who guarded every single Earth. He also faked his death so that he could plot against Necrom's return from the shadows, while his daughter, Roma, continued his plans, including the formation of Excalibur.

The conquest of Ee'rath
On Earth 148 (also known as Ee'rath), Necrom rose to power. Ee'rath was a world filled with warriors and sorcerers and Necrom created magical monks to be his agents. After defeating the champions of his Earth, also known as Excalibur, and resurrecting them as his undead slaves, Necrom was only opposed by Kylun and his lover Sat'neen. After a long battle, Necrom killed Sat'neen and turned her into an undead slave as well. Furious Kylun attacked him and his magical swords scarred Necrom's face. Necrom fled to Earth 616 and Kylun followed him, but they arrived months apart.

Excalibur and the Anti-Phoenix
Necrom went into hiding and created a servant, an invisible, murderous monster, and sent it out to steal various magical artifacts for him. The monster was defeated by the N-men and Necrom summoned the Anti-Phoenix, who had just been discovered by Excalibur. The Anti-Phoenix appeared before Necrom and he took it into himself, becoming its new host. Necrom then decided to absorb the Phoenix Force itself. He then killed many members of F.I.6, a government agency sent to investigate weird disturbances. Only Micromax managed to escape F.I.6's destruction. Necrom then attacked Excalibur itself, as their line-up included Rachel Summers, the host of the Phoenix Force. Kylun, Micromax and Feron's offspring, also known as Feron assisted Excalibur in battling Necrom, but he was too powerful. Then Necrom with a fraction of the Phoenix Force begins to compress the infinite alternate Earth’s into a singularity and began collapsing Mutliverse as also stated by Roma. Rachel decided that she, as the Phoenix, was the only one powerful enough to battle Necrom. She attacked him and teleported the two of them to another solar system. The solar system was destroyed during their combat and Rachel feared that she couldn't handle the power needed to destroy Necrom, and that at the rate their battle was escalating the entire universe could be destroyed before it ended. She then decided that Necrom probably couldn't handle the power either and tricked Necrom into touching her. Necrom tried to use his abilities as an energy vampire to drain her power, but found that the Phoenix Force's power was infinite and the power destroyed him.

Powers and abilities
Necrom was a powerful sorcerer. As his Earth's Sorcerer Supreme and the master of famous and powerful sorcerers like Feron and Merlyn, he had vast magical powers at his disposal for various effects. Necrom seemed to favour necromancy, raising the dead to act as his servants. Necrom was also an energy vampire, capable of draining his victims life-energy and abilities to strengthen himself, leaving his victim a charred husk.

Necrom could change his shape: he could stretch his arms to grab victims from afar and hide his appearance from others.  He also had exceptional resistance to physical injury, enough to be only stunned by a massive blow from Micromax and temporarily disoriented by a punch from Captain Britain.  Magical and telekinetic means were a more effective means of attacking him; he was harmed and eventually destroyed by Rachel's own telekinetic abilities, and was especially vulnerable to Kylun's magical swords, which were specially forged to slay evil creatures, suffering a permanent scar and losing an eye when Kylun struck him.

Necrom, like other members of his race, was immortal in the sense that he would never die from old age nor disease.  However, he was destroyed when his attempt to contain the Phoenix Force's limitless energy disintegrated his molecular structure and shattered his essence.

References

Comics characters introduced in 1992
Marvel Comics characters who are shapeshifters
Marvel Comics characters who use magic
Marvel Comics supervillains